Eleni Kavros DeGraw is an American politician serving as a member of the Connecticut House of Representatives from the 17th district. Elected in November 2020, she assumed office on January 6, 2021.

Early life and education 
Kavros DeGraw was born in Honolulu and raised in Alexandria, Virginia. She earned a Bachelor of Arts degree in English, with a minor in technical writing, from James Madison University.

Career 
Kavros DeGraw worked as a journalist and marketing writer. She first ran for office in 2018. In 2019, she was the campaign manager for Derek Slap. Kavros DeGraw was elected to the Connecticut House of Representatives in November 2020 and assumed office on January 6, 2021. Kavros DeGraw is the ranking member of the House Finance, Revenue, and Bonding Committee. She was re-elected as state representative on November 8, 2022.

Electoral history

References 

Living people
People from Honolulu
People from Alexandria, Virginia
James Madison University alumni
Democratic Party members of the Connecticut House of Representatives
Women state legislators in Connecticut
Year of birth missing (living people)
21st-century American women